Zeilarn is a municipality in the district of Rottal-Inn in Bavaria, Germany.

Geography

Geographical position 
Zeilarn is located in the region Landshut in a characteristic Lower Bavarian landscape of hills directly along the B20 about 14 km southeast of Eggenfelden, 18 km northeast of Altötting, 20 km north of Burghausen, 17 km northwest of Simbach and 20 km southwest of the county town Pfarrkirchen. The nearest train station is situated in Marktl.

Municipal structure 
The civil parish Zeilarn has 87 officially named districts:

 Aiching
 Babing
 Baumgarten
 Berg
 Berger
 Berghäusl
 Bildsberg
 Binderhäusl
 Brandstetten
 Breitreit
 Dambach
 Dofler
 Dornlehen
 Eben
 Edstall
 Enghasling
 Feichting
 Fingerer
 Fixing
 Frieding
 Gasteig
 Gehersdorf
 Gitzelhub
 Gitzelmühle
 Griesmühle
 Grillenhögl
 Großstraß
 Grub
 Grubwies
 Gumpersdorf
 Haid
 Hasling
 Haus
 Hempelsberg
 Hinterau
 Hochwimm
 Höllgrub
 Holzleithen
 Kagerwies
 Kellndorf
 Kleinstraß
 Knogler
 Kochsöd
 Kohlöd
 Königsöd
 Köpfing
 Kreimel
 Lanhofen
 Lederschmid
 Lehen
 Lueg
 Maisthub
 Mannersdorf
 Narrenham
 Oberlehen
 Oberndorf
 Obertürken
 Ofenschwarz
 Passelsberg
 Pirach
 Plöcking
 Prehof
 Rupprechtsaign
 Schallhub
 Schatzlöd
 Schildthurn
 Schmiding
 Schreding
 Schwertfelln
 Sonnertsham
 Speckhaus
 Stockwimm
 Straß
 Thalreuth
 Thannenthal
 Thurnöd
 Vorderau
 Waldmann
 Walln
 Wetzl
 Wiesmühle
 Wiesmühle am Türkenbach
 Wimmhäusl
 Wolfgrub
 Zantlbauer
 Zauner am Högl
 Zeilarn

History 
The first time Zeilarn was mentioned in a document was in 788 as Cidlar in the index of the archdiocese Salzburg. Later the village belonged to the county Leonberg, after its extinction in 1319 the counts of Hals inherited the properties. Until the administrative reform in Bavaria in 1818 Zeilarn belonged to the revenue office Landshut and the district court Eggenfelden. Afterwards the boroughs Obertürken, Gumpersdorf and Schildthurn emerged.

Incorporations 

Today's Zeilarn is the result of the consolidation under the local government reorganization in Bavaria in 1971.

Assignments 

In 1980 an area with a little less than 100 inhabitants was assigned to Tann.

Population development 
 1961: 1897 inhabitants
 1970: 2071 inhabitants
 1987: 2053 inhabitants
 1994: 2218 inhabitants
 2000: 2221 inhabitants
 2011: 2174 inhabitants
 2012: 2131 inhabitants
 2013: 2117 inhabitants

Politics 
Werner Lechl is the mayor, first elected in 2014, and re-elected in 2020.

Tax receipts in 1999 amounted to €1,034,000, thereof the business tax revenues (net) amounted to €390,000.

Economy and infrastructure

Economy, agriculture and forestry 
Going by official statistics there were 243 employees subject to social insurance contributions in manufacturing industries and none in retail businesses. In other economic sectors there were 46 employees subject to social insurance contributions. There was a total of 672 employees subject to social insurance contributions. There were no companies in the manufacturing sector and four in the main construction trades. In addition there were 115 agricultural holdings with a total area of 1,601 ha, thereof 914 ha fields and 682 ha permanent grassland.

Bildung 
There are the following facilities:
 kindergarten: 50 places
 elementary school: 74 pupils

Sights 
 The late Gothic parish church St. Martin was expanded in 1888. It has late Gothic furnishings with some Gothic and Baroque figures and tombstones.

References

Rottal-Inn